Charles Albert Hall Jr. (May 7, 1930 – November 20, 2014) was an American firefighter, labor activist, and politician who served as a member of the Florida House of Representatives from 1980 to 1982.

Early life and education 
Born in Miami, Florida, Hall received his bachelor's degree in labor from Florida International University and his certificate in the trade union program from the Harvard Business School.

Career 
He served as a firefighter for the City of Miami from 1952 to 1979. He was also involved with his labor union. He was also a professor at Florida International University and served on the Miami-Dade Ethics Commission. From 1980 to 1982, Hall served in the Florida House of Representatives and was a Democrat.

Personal life 
Hall died in Tallahassee, Florida.

Notes

1930 births
2014 deaths
Politicians from Miami
Harvard Business School alumni
Florida International University alumni
Florida International University faculty
American firefighters
Democratic Party members of the Florida House of Representatives